The 1899 Drake Bulldogs football team was an American football team that represented Drake University as an independent during the 1899 college football season. In its third and final season under head coach A. B. Potter, the team compiled a 5–2 record and outscored opponents by a total of 112 to 57.

Schedule

References

Drake
Drake Bulldogs football seasons
Drake Bulldogs football